Poshteh-ye Aliabad (also Romanized as Poshteh-ye ʿAlīābād) is a village in Howmeh Rural District, in the Central District of Minab County, Hormozgan Province, Iran. At the 2006 census, its population was 2,050, in 429 families.

References 

Populated places in Minab County